The Office of the Higher Education Commission (OHEC) is a department-level agency of the Thai government. It is the operating body of the Higher Education Commission, which oversees the country's universities and other higher education institutions. 

The office was established as the Ministry of State University Affairs in 1972, operating as a sub-ministry under the Office of the Prime Minister. It was elevated to ministry level in 1977, and became known as the Ministry of University Affairs until 2003, when it was restructured and absorbed into the Ministry of Education as the Office of the Higher Education Commission. In 2019, the Office was transferred to the new Ministry of Higher Education, Science, Research and Innovation.

References

Government departments of Thailand
Education in Thailand
Ministry of Higher Education, Science, Research and Innovation (Thailand)